Carolina Giants are an association football club from Carolina, Puerto Rico. They were formed in 2008 as the football branch of the existing baseball side Gigantes de Carolina. They are founding members of the Puerto Rico Soccer League, the first nationwide football league on the island. They play their matches at the Roberto Clemente Stadium which is primarily a baseball venue.

History

Puerto Rico Soccer League

2008 season
Carolina Giants debuted on July 6, 2008, in a game against Guaynabo Fluminense FC, which concluded with both teams tied 2-2. On its second game the team defeated Tornados de Humacao five goals to one. On July 19, 2008, the Gigantes won its second consecutive game against Caguas Huracán. In their fourth game, the team lost to Club Atletico River Plate Puerto Rico, three goals to one. On the fifth date of the tournament the team tied with Academia Quintana, with both team scoring a single goal. On August 10, 2008, Carolina lost to Atlético de San Juan FC. This marked the end of the league's first half, the teams would then compete against each other a second time. In the first two games of this stage, Gigantes de Carolina lost to Sevilla FC and Guaynabo Fluminense. To close the regular season, the team won 1, lost 4 and tied 1 games.

2009 season
Carolina Gigantes FC won their first game 2-1 against Academia Quintana. They ended their season in 5th place. Missing the playoffs by one position.

Club hierarchy
Gigantes de Carolina Ltd.

Chairman: Ricardo Romano

Gigantes de Carolina plc.

Vice President : Yessica Yulfo

Club treasure  : Carlos Román

Club Secretary : Annette Miro

Achievements
Liga Mayor de Fútbol Nacional: 0
Runners-up (1): 2000

Liga Premier de Fútbol de Puerto Rico: 0
Runners-up (1): 2007

Current squad

References

External links

Association football clubs established in 2008
Football clubs in Puerto Rico
Puerto Rico Soccer League teams
2008 establishments in Puerto Rico